This list summarizes the main career statistics of the Czech professional tennis player Lucie Šafářová. Šafářová won seven WTA singles titles and fifteen WTA doubles titles, including five Grand Slam doubles titles with Bethanie Mattek-Sands, at the 2015 Australian Open and French Open, the 2016 US Open, and the 2017 Australian Open and French Open. In the singles, highlights of Šafářová's career include winning the 2015 Qatar Total Open, reaching the final of the 2015 French Open and making quarter-final and semi-final appearances at the 2007 Australian Open and 2014 Wimbledon Championships respectively. Šafářová achieved her highest singles rankings of number 5 on 14 September 2015 and her highest doubles ranking of number 1 on 21 August 2017.

Performance timelines

Singles

Doubles

Significant finals

Grand Slam finals

Singles: 1 (1 runner-up)

Doubles: 5 (5 titles)

WTA Tour Championship Finals

Doubles: 1 (1 runner-up)

Premier Mandatory/Premier 5 finals

Doubles: 5 (5 titles)

WTA career finals

Singles: 17 (7 titles, 10 runners-up)

Doubles: 20 (15 titles, 5 runners-up)

ITF finals

Singles: 10 (7 titles, 3 runner-ups)

Doubles: 2 (1 title, 1 runner-up)

Olympic Medal Matches

Doubles: 1 (1 Bronze medal)

Career Grand Slam statistics

Best Grand Slam results details 
Grand Slam winners are in boldface, and runner–ups are in italics.

Head-to-head vs. top 10 ranked players

Record against top 10 players

Wins over top 10 players

Notes

References

Safarova, Lucie